Josué Aarón Gómez Gómez (born 24 August 1994) is a Mexican professional footballer who plays as a forward for USL Championship club El Paso Locomotive.

References

External links

Living people
1994 births
Mexican footballers
Mexican expatriate footballers
Association football forwards
Indios de Ciudad Juárez footballers
Potros UAEM footballers
FC Juárez footballers
El Paso Locomotive FC players
Ascenso MX players
Liga Premier de México players
Tercera División de México players
USL Championship players
Footballers from Durango
Mexican expatriate sportspeople in the United States
Expatriate soccer players in the United States
Soccer players from New Mexico